Alan Morrison is an American politician. He served as a Republican member for the 42nd district of the Indiana House of Representatives.

Morrison attended at the Slippery Rock University of Pennsylvania, where he earned his Bachelor of Science degree. He then attended at Indiana State University, where he earned his Master of Arts degree. In 2012, Morrison was elected for the 42nd district of the Indiana House of Representatives. He succeeded Dale Grubb. Morrison assumed his office on November 7, 2012.

References 

Living people
Place of birth missing (living people)
Year of birth missing (living people)
Republican Party members of the Indiana House of Representatives
21st-century American politicians
Slippery Rock University of Pennsylvania alumni
Indiana State University alumni